Dempster Jackson (November 17, 1930 – April 3, 2001) was an American rower. He competed in the men's coxless four event at the 1952 Summer Olympics.

References

1930 births
2001 deaths
American male rowers
Olympic rowers of the United States
Rowers at the 1952 Summer Olympics
Sportspeople from San Diego